Hotel Grand Pacific is a 4.5-star hotel in Victoria, British Columbia, Canada. It was built by Murray Gammon, acquired by Standard Life in the mid 1990s, and sold to Pacific Sun in 1996. It underwent a $5 million renovation in the mid 2010s.

The hotel hosts tea, and has hosted the Victoria Whisky Festival.

In August 2017, workers associated with Unifor Local 114 threatened to strike, but an agreement was made with the hotel.

References

External links
 
 

Hotels in Victoria, British Columbia